Stone, in comics, may refer to:

 Stone (Marvel Comics), a number of Marvel Comics characters
 Stone (manga), a title from Tokyopop
 Tyler Stone (Marvel Comics), a Marvel Comics character
 John Stone (comics), a character from Wildstorm's Planetary
 Mike Stone, a Marvel character using the name Sunturion

Comic creators with the surname Stone:

 Chic Stone, America comics artist
 Dave Stone, British writer

It may also refer to:

 Stone Boy, a member of the Legion of Substitute Heroes
 Stone Soup (comic strip)
 Stonecutter (comics), a Marvel Comics character
 Stonewall (comics), a Marvel Comics character

See also
Stone (disambiguation)